The discography of Japanese musician Kenichi Maeyamada, known by the stage name Hyadain, consists of one album, one extended play, 10 singles and many collaborations. While most of his work for other musicians is as a producer, occasionally Maeyamada releases music billed under his own stage name Hyadain. His first two solo singles were used as the anime Nichijous theme songs. In 2012, he released his first album 20112012, a two disc set compiling the work he did over the course of two years.

Studio albums
All release dates pertain to their release in Japan, unless stated.

Extended plays

Singles

Promotional singles

Other appearances

Notes

References

Discographies of Japanese artists
Pop music discographies